Stuart McCloskey (born 6 August 1992) is an Irish professional rugby union player who plays centre for Ulster Rugby, and has six caps for Ireland. He has been Ulster's player of the year twice, and has twice been named on the Pro14 Dream Team. He is described as "a true cornerstone of this Ulster team, providing a rounded skillset at inside centre that includes strong ball-carrying, offloading, short and long passing, a breakdown threat, defensive communication, and even attacking kicking."

Early life 

He grew up in Bangor, County Down, where his father, Wilson McCloskey, owned a landscaping business and played fullback for Ards RFC. McCloskey played rugby at Bangor Grammar School, but was not selected for any age-grade representative sides, and was not on Ulster's radar until he joined Dungannon RFC in the All-Ireland League after leaving school. Dungannon coach Kieran Campbell promoted him to the first team and recommended him to Ulster's academy manager, Allen Clarke, who asked him to join the sub-academy. He combined playing for Dungannon and games for Ulster "A" with studying structural engineering with architecture at Queens University Belfast, until he joined the full academy before the 2013–14 season.

Professional career 

He made four appearances in the senior team in the 2013-14 season, and was named Academy Player of the Year at the 2014 Ulster Rugby Awards. He played for Emerging Ireland (effectively the third XV of the Irish rugby team) at the 2014 IRB Nations Cup in June 2014. He signed a development contract ahead of the 2014–15 season, during which he made fifteen appearances, including nine starts, and won Ulster's Young Player of the Year award. He was part of the Emerging Ireland team that won the Tbilisi Cup in June 2015.

In 2015–16 he made 23 appearances for Ulster , including 21 starts, scoring four tries and making 186 tackles, won his first senior cap for Ireland against England in the 2016 Six Nations Championship, and was named Ulster's Player of the Year. In 2016–17 he made sixteen appearances, including thirteen starts, and scored two tries for Ulster, and has five caps for Ireland. In 2017–18 season he made 24 appearances, all starts, scored seven tries, and made four try assists, 213 tackles and 14 turnovers. He won his second cap for Ireland against Fiji in the 2017 end-of-year rugby union internationals. 

In 2018–19 he made 26 appearances, including 25 starts, scored four tries, made 232 tackles, and won 18 turnovers. He made his 100th appearance for Ulster in February 2019. He made his third Ireland cap, scoring a try, against the USA in the 2018 end-of-year rugby union internationals. At the end of the season he was named in the 2018–19 Pro14 Dream Team, and won Player of the Year and Supporters Club Player of the Year at the Ulster Rugby Awards. In 2019–20 he made 17 appearances, all starts, and scored three tries. He was named on the Pro14 Dream Team for the second year running. In 2020–21 he made 15 appearances, all starts, scored two tries, made 121 tackles and 13 turnovers, and carried 171 times with 40 defenders beaten and five clean breaks. He played for Ireland against Georgia in the 2020 end-of-year internationals, and against Japan and the USA in July 2021. In the 2021–22 season he has made 15 appearances, all starts, and scored three tries. He made his 150th appearance for Ulster in March 2022. He started all three of Ireland three tests in the 2022 end-of-year internationals, and was named in the Irish 6 nations squad for 2023 on the 19 January 2023. He started in Ireland's 34-10 victory over Wales in the opening week.

References

External links

United Rugby Championship profile
Ireland profile

1992 births
Living people
Ulster Rugby players
Rugby union centres
Dungannon RFC players
Irish rugby union players
Ireland international rugby union players
People educated at Bangor Grammar School